Brit Awards 1994  was the 14th edition of the Brit Awards, an annual pop music awards ceremony in the United Kingdom. It was organised by the British Phonographic Industry and took place on 14 February 1994 at Alexandra Palace in London. It was the first year that the  British Dance Act award was given.

Performances
 Björk and PJ Harvey – "(I Can't Get No) Satisfaction"
 Bon Jovi featuring Brian May and Dina Carroll – "I'll Sleep When I'm Dead"
 Elton John and RuPaul – "Don't Go Breaking My Heart"
 Meat Loaf – "I'd Do Anything for Love (But I Won't Do That)"
 Pet Shop Boys – "Go West"
 Stereo MCs – "Connected"
 Take That – "The Beatles Medley"
 Van Morrison featuring Shane MacGowan – "Have I Told You Lately"

Winners and nominees

References

External links
Brit Awards 1994 at Brits.co.uk

Brit Awards
Brit Awards
Brit Awards
Brit Awards
Brit Awards
Brit Awards